Lidija Bačić (born 4 August 1985), also known as Lille, is a Croatian pop singer and actress. She rose to fame in 2005 after finishing as runner-up on the second season of Hrvatski Idol. Later in 2010, she released her debut album, Majčina ljubav.

Bačić has collaborated with several musical artists, including Mladen Grdović, Alen Vitasović, Zanamari Lalic and Luka Basi.

Early life 
Lidija was born in Split on 4 August 1985. She has two sisters and a brother. She was raised in the Roman Catholic faith.

Bačić began performing at local festivals and competitions from the age of ten. She won her first prize at Dječji Festival in 1997 for her cover version of Mišo Limić's song "Zaljubljeni dječak".

Career 
In early 2000, Bačić joined the group Perle. The group played at various festivals with Bačić being the main vocalist. In 2001, they tried to represent Croatia at the Eurovision Song Contest with the song "Pokraj bistra izvora" placing 15th in a field of 20 competing entries.

Bačić auditioned for the second season of Hrvatski Idol in Split, Croatia.

In January 2019, Bačić was announced as one of the 16 participants in Dora 2019, the national contest in Croatia to select the country's Eurovision Song Contest entry, where she, and the song "Tek je počelo", finished in 11th place.

Discography

Studio albums 
 Majčina ljubav (2010)
 Daj da noćas poludimo (2011)
 Viski (2015)
 Tijelo kao pjesma (2017)
 Revolucija (2020)
 Flashback (2022)

Singles

Filmography 
 Aleksi (movie), as Lille (2017)
 Ko te šiša (TV), as Lille (2018)
 Na granici (TV), as Lille (2018)
 Blago Nama (TV), as Lidija (2022)

References

External links 

1985 births
Living people
Croatian pop singers
Musicians from Split, Croatia
21st-century Croatian women singers